The 5 cm SK L/40 gun was a German naval gun used in World War I and World War II.

Service 
The 5 cm SK L/40 gun was primarily used as an anti-torpedo boat gun aboard avisos, corvettes, gunboats, protected cruisers, submarines, torpedo boats, and unprotected cruisers. It was used by the navies of the German Empire, Nazi Germany, Belgium, and The Netherlands.

Ship classes that carried the 5 cm SK L/40 include:
 A-class torpedo boats
 Type UB II submarines
 S7-class torpedo boats
 S66-class torpedo boats
 G88-class torpedo boats
 S90-class torpedo boats
 Irene-class cruisers

See also
 List of naval guns
 5.2 cm SK L/55 naval gun

Notes

References

Bibliography

External links
 http://www.navweaps.com/Weapons/WNGER_5cm-40_skc93.htm

50 mm artillery
Naval guns of Germany
World War I naval weapons
World War II naval weapons